Haupapa / Tasman Glacier is the largest glacier in New Zealand, and one of several large glaciers which flow south and east towards the Mackenzie Basin from the Southern Alps in New Zealand's South Island.

Geography
At  in length, Tasman Glacier is still New Zealand's longest glacier, despite shrinking considerably from the 1990s onwards. After the summer melt,  may remain in the high altitude glacier head.

The Tasman flows south west from Hochstetter Dome and Mount Elie De Beaumont alongside the southern slopes of The Minarets and south along the eastern flank of New Zealand's two highest mountains, Mount Tasman and its higher southern neighbour Aoraki / Mount Cook.

Although its upper reaches are snow-covered, rocks carried by the glacier are exposed by ablation along its course, and the lower glacier is entirely rock-covered.  The rock cover helps insulate the ice from the sunlight and slows down the melting process. Tributaries in the lower parts are the Rudolf Glacier, Forrest Ross Glacier, named after Forrestina Ross), Kaufmann Glacier, Haast Glacier, Hochstetter Glacier, and Ball Glacier.

The glacial terminal lake is met by the meltwater of the Murchison Glacier, which approaches from the northeast and flows alongside the Tasman Glacier outside the moraine wall. The waters of Tasman Lake flow into the Tasman River and flow south joining the Hooker River draining the proglacial lakes on the Hooker and Mueller Glaciers. The Tasman River exhibits a braided characteristic, and flows south into Lake Pukaki. They eventually flow into the Waitaki River and to the Pacific Ocean north of Oamaru.

Recent retreat

The glacier remained at a constant  in length for all of its recorded history in the 20th century before starting its current period of rapid melting in the 1990s. Between 2000 and 2008 alone, the glacier terminus receded 3.7 km. Since the 1990s the terminus has retreated about  a year on average. The glacier is now in a period of faster retreat where the rate of retreat is calculated to be between  each year. It is estimated that the Tasman Glacier will eventually disappear and the terminal Tasman Lake will reach a maximum size in 10 to 19 years time.

A large calving event was possibly triggered, or at least contributed to, by the 2011 Christchurch earthquake on 22 February 2011. On this day 30 to 40 million metric tons (33 to 44 million short tons)
 of ice dropped from the terminal face of the Tasman Glacier and fell into the Tasman Lake. Similar events in the past have been attributed to buoyancy effects, a result of high basal water pressures and increased lake level following heavy rainfall events.

Access and tourism

Tasman Glacier has a long history of tourism, with heli skiing tours offered on the upper glacier since the early 1970s.  The tributary Ball Glacier was also popular for skiing, with national championships being held there in the 1930s. It has since diminished too far to be safely accessed. Similarly, Tasman Glacier's significant ice loss over the past decades has impacted tourism, with an increasing number of crevasses being exposed and not filled in by snow any more, requiring guided tours to avoid these areas, and restricting the heli skiing season to July, August and September.

The proglacial Tasman Lake is a popular destination for boat tours among the icebergs often floating in the lake.

The Ball Shelter Track, part of the Ball Hut Route, leads along the western side of the glacier, separated from Tasman Lake by a tall moraine wall until about 6 kilometres in, where it climbs high enough for the view to open up.

See also
 Glaciers of New Zealand
 List of glaciers
 Retreat of glaciers since 1850 – Oceania

References

Further reading
 Satellite Image Atlas of Glaciers of the World, Glaciers of New Zealand, Chinn, T.H., USGS Professional Paper 1386, 1988.

External links

 Department of Conservation – Tasman Valley walking tracks

Landforms of Canterbury, New Zealand
Glaciers of New Zealand
Southern Alps